Quanto è bello lu murire acciso, also known as The Expedition and How Wonderful to Die Assassinated, is a 1976 Italian historical drama film directed by Ennio Lorenzini. It depicts the failed  expedition  organized by Carlo Pisacane in 1857 to provoke a rising in the Kingdom of the Two Sicilies.

For this film Lorenzini won the Nastro d'Argento for Best New Director and a special David di Donatello.

Cast 

Giulio Brogi as Major De Liguoro 
Stefano Satta Flores as  Carlo Pisacane
Angela Goodwin as Enrichetta
Bruno Corazzari as  'Ntoni
Alessandro Haber as  Nicotera

See also 
 
 List of Italian films of 1976

References

External links

1976 films
Italian drama films
Films set in 1857
Films about revolutions
Italian films based on actual events
1976 directorial debut films
1970s Italian films